Eurygaster testudinaria is a Palearctic shieldbug. It occurs in Europe from the Northern Mediterranean to southern Scandinavia, and East through Central Asia to northern China and Japan.

This species is very difficult to differentiate from Eurygaster maura but testudinaria has a slight central depression at the front of the head. Its colour similarly varies.

Eurygaster testudinaria feeds on Poaceae (grasses).

References 

 Ekkehard Wachmann, Albert Melber, Jürgen Deckert: Wanzen. Band 4: Pentatomomorpha II: Pentatomoidea: Cydnidae, Thyreocoridae, Plataspidae, Acanthosomatidae, Scutelleridae, Pentatomidae. (= Die Tierwelt Deutschlands und der angrenzenden Meeresteile nach ihren Merkmalen und nach ihrer Lebensweise. 81. Teil). Goecke & Evers, Keltern 2008, .

External links 
 British Bugs

testudinaria
Hemiptera of Europe
Insects described in 1785